Zohouri is a surname. Notable people with the surname include:

 Taghi Zohouri (1912–1992), Iranian actor and comedian
 Masoud Zoohori (born 1964), Iranian-Australian media proprietor and darts player
Sahar Zohouri (born 1986), Iranian professional darts player